MacWise is a terminal emulator for the Apple Macintosh, written by Carnation Software and first released in 1996.
MacWise emulates terminals including Wyse 50, Wyse 60, Wyse 370, VT100, VT220, Adds Viewpoint, Prism and TV 925. A version for OS X appeared in 2002. A version for OS X Mountain Lion appeared in 2012.

MacWise was re-written in 2019 as a 64-bit Macintosh app.

References

Classic Mac OS software
Terminal emulators